Erich Joonas (also Erich Jonas; 26 April 1893 Kavastu Parish (now Peipsiääre Parish), Kreis Dorpat – 26 May 1944 Viljandi) was an Estonian politician. He was a member of Estonian Constituent Assembly.

References

1893 births
1944 deaths
People from Peipsiääre Parish
People from Kreis Dorpat
Estonian Independent Socialist Workers' Party politicians
Estonian Socialist Workers' Party politicians
Members of the Estonian Constituent Assembly
Members of the Riigikogu, 1920–1923
Members of the Riigikogu, 1923–1926
Members of the Riigikogu, 1926–1929
Members of the Riigikogu, 1929–1932
Members of the Riigikogu, 1932–1934